Marjorie Ann "Marge" (née Davis) Anderson (April 21, 1932 – June 29, 2013) was an Ojibwe Elder and politician for the Mille Lacs Band of Ojibwe, located in east-central Minnesota.

Biography 
Mille Lacs Band Elder Marge Anderson was born on the Mille Lacs Reservation, was fluent in the Ojibwe language, and had served more than 30 years in the Band's tribal government.

Anderson began her public service in 1976 as District I Representative. She then served as Secretary/Treasurer from 1987 to 1991 before being appointed Chairman of the Mille Lacs Band in 1991 after Arthur Gahbow died while in office. She was elected to the post in 1992 (with the post changing its title from Chairman to the Chief Executive) and elected again in 1996. In 2000 Melanie Benjamin replaced her as Chief Executive until December 2008, when Anderson won the post back in a special election. Then in 2012 Benjamin again won the post from her in another election. As the Chief Executive, Anderson was the first woman to lead the Mille Lacs Band of Ojibwe, and indeed the first woman to lead any Minnesota Indian tribe. During her tenure as Chief Executive, Anderson had led the development of Grand Casino Mille Lacs and Grand Casino Hinckley and the rebuilding of the reservation through new schools, clinics, community centers, housing, a water treatment plant, and other infrastructure. Her efforts to strengthen tribal self-governance and increase American Indians’ self-sufficiency had received national recognition. She died in the small Minnesota city of Onamia.

References

External links 
 The official website of the Mille Lacs Band of Ojibwe
 Biographies of Mille Lacs Band of Ojibwe's elected and appointed officials
 "Marge Anderson elected Mille Lacs Band leader again" By Joe Kimball in December 18, 2008, edition of MinnPost

|-

|-

|-

1932 births
2013 deaths
20th-century Native Americans
21st-century Native Americans
Chief Executives of the Mille Lacs Band of Ojibwe
Female Native American leaders
Mille Lacs Band of Ojibwe politicians
Native American women in politics
Ojibwe people
People from Mille Lacs County, Minnesota
Women in Minnesota politics
20th-century Native American women
21st-century Native American women